Martin Zsirai (born 19 March 1994) is a Hungarian football player who plays for Pápa.

Club statistics

Updated to games played as of 22 January 2016.

References 

1994 births
Living people
People from Pápa
Hungarian footballers
Hungary youth international footballers
Association football defenders
Szombathelyi Haladás footballers
FC Ajka players
Mosonmagyaróvári TE 1904 footballers
Lombard-Pápa TFC footballers
Kaposvári Rákóczi FC players
Nemzeti Bajnokság I players
Nemzeti Bajnokság II players
Nemzeti Bajnokság III players
Sportspeople from Veszprém County
21st-century Hungarian people